Cavit Şadi Pehlivanoğlu (1927 – 21 November 2015) was a Turkish statesman, who served as a legislator of the Grand National Assembly of Turkey for three terms between 1961 and 1996, first as a member of Justice Party (Turkey) and then as the Vice President of Motherland Party (Turkey) that he founded together with Turgut Özal and others. He was elected from the province Ordu. He held several positions within the parliament. Both before and after his active political career, he worked as an attorney at law and a business executive for various associations.  He was well known for his controversial actions and political speeches.

Pehlivanoğlu died on 21 November 2015, aged 88.

References

1927 births
2015 deaths
Deputies of Ordu
Justice Party (Turkey) politicians
20th-century Turkish politicians
Motherland Party (Turkey) politicians
People from Rize
Turkish business executives
20th-century Turkish lawyers
Istanbul University Faculty of Law alumni